Tam is a short form of Thomas (name) in Scots, a nickname and a surname. It may refer to:


Thomas
 Tam Dean Burn (born 1958), Scottish actor
 Tam Courts (born 1981), Scottish footballer
 Tam Dalyell of the Binns (1615–1685), Scottish Royalist general in the Wars of the Three Kingdoms
 Tam Dalyell (1932–2017), Scottish politician and Member of Parliament (1962-2005)
 Tam Galbraith (1917–1982), Scottish politician
 Thomas McGraw (1952–2007), Scottish gangster
 Tam McManus (born 1981), Scottish former footballer

Nickname or other first name
 Tamunoemi "Tam" David-West (1936–2019), Nigerian academic, social critic and former federal minister
 Tam Joseph (born 1947), Dominica-born British painter formerly known as Tom Joseph
 Tam or Tom Kellichan (born c. 1954), Scottish musician, The Skids original drummer (1977–1979)
 Tam Lenfestey (1818–1885), Guernsey poet
 Tamandani "Tam" Nsaliwa (born 1982), Malawian footballer
 Walter Sumner "Tam" Rose (1888–1961), American football player and head coach
 Hubert Tamblyn "Tam" Spiva (1932–2017), American television screenwriter of The Brady Bunck and Gentle Ben

Surname
 the Cantonese romanisation of Tan (surname) (譚),  a common Chinese surname
 Reuben Tam (1916–1991), American artist
 Rabbeinu Tam (1100–1171), Rabbi Jacob Tam
 Rod Tam (1953–2019), American businessman and politician

Fictional characters
 River Tam and Simon Tam, fictional characters/siblings from Firefly
 Tam Song, supporting character in the book series Keeper of The Lost Cities by Shannon Messenger
 Tam Amber, supporting character in The Ballad of Songbirds and Snakes by Suzanne Collins

See also
 John Tams (born 1949), English actor, singer, songwriter, composer and musician

Hypocorisms
Lists of people by nickname